Charles C. Davies (28 September 1881 – 13 August 1964) was a British sprint athlete.  He competed at the 1908 Summer Olympics in London.

In the 400 metres, Davies won his preliminary heat with a time of 50.4 seconds to advance to the semifinals. There, he dropped his time to 49.8 seconds, but still lost to John Carpenter who ran the course in 49.4 seconds. Davies did not advance to the final.

References

External links
 
 
 
 

1881 births
1964 deaths
Athletes (track and field) at the 1908 Summer Olympics
British male sprinters
Olympic athletes of Great Britain